Philip L. Fradkin (February 28, 1935 – July 8, 2012) was an American environmentalist historian, journalist, and author. Fradkin authored books ranging from Alaska, California, and Nevada, with topics ranging from water conservation, earthquakes, and nuclear weapons.

Born in Manhattan, Fradkin grew up in Montclair, New Jersey and attended Montclair Kimberley Academy, graduating in the class of 1953.

In 1964, Fradkin began working for the Los Angeles Times, and the following year was part of the metropolitan staff awarded a Pulitzer Prize for its work on the 1965 Watts riots.  In 2005, Fradkin was given the California Award by the Commonwealth Club of California.

He commented on controversial issues such as plagiarism allegations towards Wallace Stegner's Pulitzer Prize-winning novel, Angle of Repose, based on the letters of the American Old West author Mary Hallock Foote.

Selected works
 California : the golden coast (1974)  
 A river no more : the Colorado River and the West (1981)  
 Fallout: An American Nuclear Tragedy (1989)  
 Sagebrush country : land and the American West (1989)  
 Wanderings of an environmental journalist in Alaska and the American West (1993)  
 The seven states of California : a natural and human history (1995)  
 Magnitude 8 : earthquakes and life along the San Andreas Fault (1998)  
 Wildest Alaska : journeys of great peril in Lituya Bay (2001)  
 Stagecoach : Wells Fargo and the American West (2002)   
 The great earthquake and firestorms of 1906 : how San Francisco nearly destroyed itself (2005)  
 After the ruins, 1906 and 2006 : rephotographing the San Francisco earthquake and fire (2006)  
 Wallace Stegner and the American West (2008)

References

External links
 Official Website

American male non-fiction writers
Montclair Kimberley Academy alumni
People from Montclair, New Jersey
Williams College alumni
1935 births
2012 deaths
American non-fiction environmental writers